The timeline of the Battle of Mosul (2016–2017) is divided into the three phases.
 Timeline of the Battle of Mosul (2016–2017): Phase One
 Timeline of the Battle of Mosul (2016–2017): Phase Two
 Timeline of the Battle of Mosul (2016–2017): Phase Three

See also

External links 
 Interactive Syria and Iraq map with current Mosul military situation
 ISIS news map
 CNN report – 28 hours: Leading the Mosul attack, under fire, then trapped
 Map of all restored Mosul city districts – with timeline notes attached for each district, published by Google Maps
 

Battle of Mosul (2016–17)